The territorial matrix is the tissue surrounding chondrocytes (cells which produce cartilage) in cartilage. Chondrocytes are inactive cartilage cells, so they don't make cartilage components. The territorial matrix is basophilic (attracts basic compounds and dyes due to its anionic/acidic nature), because there is a higher concentration of proteoglycans, so it will color darker when it's colored and viewed under a microscope. In other words, it stains metachromatically (dyes change color upon binding) due to the presence of proteoglycans (compound molecules composed of proteins and sugars).

References

Skeletal system
Tissues (biology)